Clarkson-Watson House, also known as the Bank of Germantown and Germantown Historical Society, is a historic home located in the Wister neighborhood of Philadelphia, Pennsylvania. It was built between 1740 and 1750, and modified in the 1770s.  It is a -story, stuccoed stone dwelling with a rear brick addition.  It has a gable roof with dormers.

It was added to the National Register of Historic Places in 1973.

References

External links
 Germantown Historical Society

Houses on the National Register of Historic Places in Philadelphia
Houses completed in 1745
Wister, Philadelphia